The Eastern Zone was one of the three regional zones of the 1979 Davis Cup.

10 teams entered the Eastern Zone, with 6 teams competing in the preliminary round to join the previous year's semifinalists in the main draw. Japan and India received byes into the quarterfinals, while Australia and New Zealand received byes into the semifinals. The winner of the main draw went on to compete in the Inter-Zonal Zone against the winners of the Americas Zone and Europe Zone.

Australia defeated New Zealand in the final and progressed to the Inter-Zonal Zone.

Preliminary rounds

Draw

Pre-qualifying round
Pakistan vs. South Korea

Preliminary round
Indonesia vs. Chinese Taipei

Main Draw

Draw

Quarterfinals
Japan vs. Pakistan

India vs. Indonesia

Semifinals
New Zealand vs. Japan

India vs. Australia

Final
New Zealand vs. Australia

References

External links
Davis Cup official website

Davis Cup Asia/Oceania Zone
Eastern Zone
Davis Cup
Davis Cup
Davis Cup
Davis Cup